Belden is a masculine given name. Notable people with the name include:

Belden Bly (1914–2006), American teacher
Belden Hill (1864–1934), American baseball player
Belden Namah (21st century), Papua New Guinean politician
David Belden Lyman (1803–1884), American missionary
Silas Belden Dutcher (1829–1909), New York State Superintendent of Public Works

Masculine given names